Vakkom Abdul Khader (1917–1943) was an Indian revolutionary and soldier in the Indian National Army, which fought for Indian freedom under Subhas Chandra Bose allied with Japan. Khader was a revolutionary and trained radio communicator. He was hanged in Madras Central Jail on 10 September 1943 with three comrades: Satyen Bardhan and Anandan and Fauja Singh. All three walked to their execution singing Vande Mataram. Abdul Khader also shouted "Netaji Subhas Babu ki jai! Down with the British Government! Victory to India!”

Early life and career 
Abdul Khader was born on 25 May 1917, at Vakkom, Thiruvananthapuram District. His father was Vavakunju and mother was Ummusalma. He attended local primary school and received his secondary education at Sree Narayana Vilasa high school (founded by Sree Narayan Guru). He was a school hero and a good football player. He was active in the freedom struggle, delighting people with his exciting patriotic songs. During Mahatma Gandhi’s visit to Kerala, the train stopped at Kadakkavur railway station, where locals proudly said that Gandhiji was garlanded in the midst of a large crowd by a young boy named Abdul Khader. 

In 1938, when he was 21, Khader moved to Malaysia at his father’s behest, joining the engineering section of the Public Works Department. The excitement of the Indian freedom struggle, however, shook Khader's mind. He joined the Indian Independence League, which was fighting for Indian independence in Malaysia at the time, and later became a revolutionary leader. He was also the secretary of the Kerala Muslim Union, a group of Kerala Muslims in Malaysia who collaborated with the Independence League. Khader joined the Indian National Army, which was formed by Netaji Subhas Bose, its Commander-in-Chief. After completing his training at the Indian Swaraj Institute (housed in the Free School, Penang, now the Penang Museum), which was set up to train Indian National Army soldiers, Khader became a member of the Choir Squad, a corps of heroes.

Revolutionary activities 
One batch which landed at Tanur, in Malabar Coast and was composed of Abdul Khader and S.A. Anandan and three others. They came by submarine and were transferred to a rubber boat five miles off the land. On landing before they could find a safe hideout they were noticed by the men on the shore and were looked upon with suspicion. The police was informed. Khader and his comrades, were arrested within a few hours of their landing.

Trial and sentence 
After all of the twenty men including Abdul, Satyen Bardhan, Fauja Singh and Anandan were arrested, they were then removed to Fort St. George, India at Madras in due course of time. They were even tortured in Madras Fort in order to tell all the secret about their intention to enter India, which was their own Motherland.

Death 
The soldiers of the Indian National Army, Abdul Khader and his three comrades Satyen Bardhan, Fauja Singh and Anandan were executed in the Madras Penitentiary on 10 September 1943. Almost the whole night previous to the executions the prison reverberated with the song Vande Mataram. With great courage each of them, Abdul Khader, Satyen Bardhan, Fauja Singh and Anandan, ascended the steps to the gallows while raising the slogan of Vande Mataram, which meant ''Hail my Motherland''. Abdul Khader himself raised the slogan '' Netaji Subhas Babu ki jai ! Down with the British Government ! Victory to India ! ''

Khader and others were executed at on Friday, 10 September 1943, at twelve o'clock midnight. A small memorial is built at Travancore in their memory.

References 

 
Indian nationalists
Indian revolutionaries
Revolutionary movement for Indian independence
Indian nationalist political parties
1917 births
1943 deaths